Catherine de Brassac née de Sainte-Maure de Montausier (1587–11 May 1648) was a French courtier. She served as Première dame d'honneur to the queen of France, Anne of Austria, from 1638 until 1643.

Biography 
She was the daughter of François de Sainte-Maure, baron de Montausier, and Louise Gillier, and married to Jean de Galard de Bearn, comte de Brassac (d. 1645), in 1602.  In 1638, the king and Cardinal Richelieu reorganized the household of the queen and replaced everyone considered disloyal to the king and the Cardinal with their own loyalists.  

Consequently, Françoise de Lansac was appointed royal governess, and count de Brassac, and his spouse Catherine de Brassac was appointed superintendent of the household of the queen and Première dame d'honneur respectively in order to keep the queen and her household under control. 

When Queen Anne became regent in 1643, Catherine was replaced with Marie-Claire de Fleix.

References 
 Kleinman, Ruth: Anne of Austria. Queen of France. . Ohio State University Press (1985)

 

1648 deaths
17th-century French women
French ladies-in-waiting
1587 births
Court of Louis XIII
Household of Anne of Austria